Antonio Forte, OFM (9 July 1928 – 11 September 2006) was an Italian ordinary of the Catholic Church and a Franciscan. He was the Bishop of Avellino and before that was the Bishop of Ariano Irpino-Lacedonia.

Biography 
On 1 October 1944, Forte entered the Order of Friars Minor and was ordained a Franciscan priest on 25 February 1951.

Following his position as provincial vicar and minister of the Franciscan order, he was appointed Bishop of Ariano Irpino-Lacedonia . He was consecrated a bishop on 10 September 1988, his consecrator being Bernardin Cardinal Gantin and co-consecrators Gioacchino Illiano, Bishop of Nocera Inferiore-Sarno and Nicola Agnozzi OFM Conv., Bishop of Ariano Irpino-Lacedonia.

On 20 February 1993, Forte was appointed Bishop of Avellino.  He resigned due to age on 13 November 2004, assuming the title Bishop Emeritus of Avellino.  He then moved to the convent of Bracigliano and, after surgery-related health problems, he moved to Santa Maria degli Angeli in Nocera Superiore, the location of the Franciscan provincial infirmary.  On 11 September 2006, he died at the infirmary.

See also 
Catholic Church in Italy

References 

21st-century Italian Roman Catholic bishops
20th-century Italian Roman Catholic bishops
1928 births
2006 deaths
People from the Province of Salerno
Bishops of Ariano
Bishops of Avellino
Italian Friars Minor
Franciscan bishops